Caesar Litton Falkiner (26 September 1863 – 5 August 1908) was an Irish Unionist Party politician, barrister and a writer on literary and historical topics.

Life
Falkiner was the second son of Sir Frederick Falkiner, who was subsequently the Recorder of Dublin (1876 –1905.) He studied at the University of Dublin (BA)  – where he was the President of the University Philosophical Society (1885–1886) – and at the King's Inns, Dublin (prior to his call to the Bar in 1887.)

He was an unsuccessful candidate in the South Armagh constituency at the 1892 United Kingdom general election.

He appointed Assistant Legal Commissioner in the Irish Land Commission in 1897 and continued in that post until his death. He was also Secretary of the Council of the Royal Irish Academy.

At the time of his death, Falkiner was preparing an edition of the letters of Jonathan Swift, a task which was taken up and completed (6 vols, 1910 – 1914) by F Elrington Ball. It appears that the edition of Thomas Moore's poetry which he was reportedly preparing for the Clarendon Press was never completed. (Godley (1910) seems not to be a continuation of this work.)

He was killed in an accident on 5 August 1908 while on a mountain-climbing holiday in the Alps.

In 1910 a memorial to him was erected in the south aisle of the nave of St. Patrick's Cathedral, Dublin, beside the bust commemorating W.E.H. Lecky. 
The memorial consists of a bronze bas relief portrait of Falkiner, on a marble ground, with an inscription. At the unveiling of this monument, his contemporary and friend Colonel Edward Macartney-Filgate spoke as follows:

Family
Falkiner had married on 4 August 1892 Henrietta Mary Deane, daughter of Sir Thomas Newenham Deane, with whom he had two daughters.

Works as Author

Works as Editor

Notes

References

 
 
 
  v-vi
 

20th-century Irish historians
Irish antiquarians
Irish Anglicans
Irish non-fiction writers
Irish male non-fiction writers
Irish barristers
Irish Unionist Party politicians
1908 deaths
1863 births